Alexandr Yakovlevich Tal (July 18, 1840 – October 16, 1911) was an Imperial Russian corps commander. He took part in the suppression of the uprising in Poland and the war against the Ottoman Empire. He died in what is now Pushkin, Saint Petersburg.

1840 births
1911 deaths
Russian people of the January Uprising
Russian military personnel of the Russo-Turkish War (1877–1878)